"Episode 3" is the third and final episode of the British miniseries The Casual Vacancy based on the novel of the same title by J. K. Rowling.

Synopsis

With the parish council election imminent, tensions rise in Pagford as each side steps up their campaign. Who will triumph in an election fraught with passion, duplicity and unexpected revelations? The battle lines are drawn, and the fate of Sweetlove House hangs in the balance.

Reception
The episode received positive reviews from critics. Michael Hogan of The Telegraph gave the episode 3 out of 5 stars, despite some reservations about the digressions, saying:

References

External links
 

2015 British television episodes
The Casual Vacancy (miniseries) episodes